Pingli may refer to:

 Pingli County, a county of Ankang, Shaanxi, China
 Pingli, Nissing, a village in Nissing, Haryana, India
 Pingali, Parbhani, a village in Maharashtra state of India